The Hermalle-sous-Huy train collision  was a collision between a passenger train and a freight train in Hermalle-sous-Huy, Belgium, on 5 June 2016.  At least three people were killed and 36 others were injured, nine of them seriously.

The crash 
The crash occurred at 23:03 CEST (21:03 UTC), when the passenger train crashed into the rear of the goods train while the two trains were on the same line. The driver of the passenger train was one of the fatalities. All on board had been rescued from the train by 02:00 on 6 June. Those less seriously injured were taken to Flône Abbey, or a nearby sports centre. The passenger train comprised two SNCB Class AM96 electric multiple units. It was travelling from Mouscron to Liers via Namur and Liège. The freight train had about 30 wagons in its consist.

The front two carriages of unit 548 were severely damaged. Unit 461 was at the rear of the train. It had about 40 passengers on board. It was reported that an earlier lightning strike had caused disruption on the Liège–Namur railway line. A signal fault had been reported at 21:30, but was said to have been cleared at the time of the accident. Belgian Prime Minister Charles Michel tweeted his condolences to the victims and wished the injured a speedy recovery. He and King Philippe visited the site of the accident on 6 June.

Following the accident, it was revealed that the signal that was passed at danger was not equipped with the TBL 1+ train protection system, which is capable of automatic brake application if a train passes a red signal. This system was introduced following the Buizingen train crash in 2011. 

The train event recorders of the passenger train were recovered from the wreckage on 8 June in an apparently undamaged condition. Infrabel stated that repairs to the tracks to allow single-line working for intercity trains would be completed by 8 June, with local trains being replaced by buses. It was intended that all track repairs would be completed by the evening of 9 June, which was achieved. Normal service resumed that day.

Investigation
The Railway Accident and Incident Investigation Unit of the Federal Public Service Mobility and Transport opened an investigation into the accident.

The train event recorder revealed that the driver of the train passed a signal displaying a double yellow (caution) aspect. However, he only started to brake when the freight train came in sight. The investigation resulted in an intermediate report being published in June 2017. It concluded that it was likely that the passenger train overran a red signal.

Notes

References

2016 in Belgium
Accidents and incidents involving SNCB
History of Liège Province
June 2016 events in Europe
Railway accidents in 2016
Railway accidents and incidents in Belgium
Railway accidents involving a signal passed at danger
2016 disasters in Belgium